The Masters of Formula 3 was a Formula Three race held annually, usually at the Circuit Park Zandvoort in the Netherlands. Due to noise restrictions in the Zandvoort area, the 2007 and 2008 races were held in the Belgian circuit of Zolder. However, it returned to Zandvoort for the 2009 race.

The Masters was first started in 1991, as an international meeting between drivers from various national championships across Europe. As the FIA European Formula Three Cup had been cancelled after the 1990 season, the Masters became the unofficial European F3 championship. Many of Formula One's future stars raced and won in the Masters, including David Coulthard, who was crowned champion in the first event.

In 1999, the FIA nominated the Pau round of French Formula Three Championship as the new European Cup, but the Masters retained its status as the de facto international meeting between up-and-coming superstars all across Europe, as drivers from the British, French, German and Italian championships continued to flock to the Dutch track. When the French and German series were merged into the Formula 3 Euro Series in 2003, the Masters was not included in the calendar at the time, but its position as the premier international F3 meeting in Europe was not threatened.

The event was sponsored by Marlboro from 1991 to 2005. When tobacco advertising was banned in the European Union after 31 July 2005, the Masters lost its sponsorship. The race was sponsored by BP Ultimate took from 2006 to 2007, RTL in 2008, Tango in 2009 and RTL again in 2010.

For the first time since its creation the series took a one-year break in 2017 due to calendar changes on the circuit and FIA Formula 3 European Championship regulations which prohibits any racing activity prior the round on the same circuit. But the race did not return in 2018, which made the 2016 race the final race of the event thus far.

Results

References

External links
 Circuit Zandvoort

 
Formula Three races
Recurring sporting events established in 1991
Recurring sporting events disestablished in 2016
Sports competitions in Zandvoort
1991 establishments in the Netherlands
2016 disestablishments in the Netherlands